Ba humbugi is the only species and therefore the type species in the genus Ba, a genus of land snail, belonging to the family Charopidae. Both the genus and the species were named by the American malacologist Alan Solem.

Taxonomic history
Alan Solem, the curator of invertebrates at the Field Museum of Natural History, created the genus Ba for his newly-described species . Solem based his description of the type species  on a holotype which the American malacologist Yoshio Kondo had collected in 1938 and three paratypes. One paratype was deposited in the Field Museum; the remaining specimens in the type series were deposited in the Bishop Museum.

Etymology
Solem chose the generic name Ba after Ba District, Fiji, which extends into  range. This led to him having an "irresistible impulse" to name the type species , in reference to the character Ebenezer Scrooge's catchphrase "Bah! Humbug!" from Charles Dickens's novella A Christmas Carol. One review of Solem's monograph naming this species said his choice in taxa names "may either lighten the reader's day or engender hostility", giving this binomen as an example.

Distribution
 is endemic to Fiji.

Description
Ba is characterized by having a high spire and an umbilicus which is either completely closed or slightly laterally cracked. There are only 3⅛–3½ whorls, and its apical sculpture consists of about a dozen spiral cords. The height-to-diameter ratio ranges from 0.752 to 0.842. Its shell is a light reddish-yellow; its periostracal extensions are an almost black dark brown. The body is yellow-white and lacks any sort of dark markings.

Biology
 is sympatric with Sinployea irregularis; both species were found under the same log. It is probably strictly terrestrial due to a lack of black marks on its body.

Conservation status and threats
According to the IUCN Red List,  is endangered. They note that only four specimens have been found despite many surveys on Viti Levu over a century and a half. The IUCN believes invasive species, such as the Pacific rat, black rat, house mouse, and various invasive ant species, also negatively affect . The IUCN predicts it would be detrimental if the invasive giant African snail, rosy wolf snail, or the New Guinea flatworm were introduced to Viti Levu.

References

Works cited

External links

  Paratype.

Charopidae
Endemic fauna of Fiji
Gastropods described in 1983
Humour in science